Sindh province of Pakistan is home to nearly 3000 sites and monuments, of which 1600 as protected under the provincial, Sindh Cultural Heritage (Protection) Act 1994 while 1200 remain unprotected.

Following is the list of cultural heritage sites in the province. The list also includes the two inscribed, four tentative UNESCO World Heritage Site and four national monuments in Sindh province.

Note: If the site is protected under both the federal and provincial governments, it is listed under the former.

Protected sites
Following is the list of sites formerly protected by the Government of Pakistan.

Districts: Badin to Jamshoro

|}

Karachi

Districts: Khairpur to Tharparkar

|}

Thatta

|}

Protected Heritage
The sites below are declared Protected Heritage by the Government of Sindh.

Districts: Hyderabad to Sukkur

|}

Karachi

The city has over 350 sites which are protected under the Provincial Act. Sites are listed under broad areas or quarters under which they are located. Some streets/roads are found in two areas. Sites located on them are found under their respective area.

Unprotected Heritage

Districts: Hyderabad to Jamshoro

|}

Karachi

Districts: Khairpur to Umerkot

|}

See also
 List of cultural heritage sites in Karachi

References

 01
Archaeological sites in Pakistan
Architecture in Sindh
Buildings and structures in Sindh